HN Andromedae (often abbreviated to HN And) is a variable star in the constellation Andromeda. Its apparent visual magnitude varies between 6.67 and 6.76 in a cycle of 69.51 days. It is classified as an α2 Canum Venaticorum variable.

System
The HN Andromedae system is triple, as seen in periodic radial velocity variations. The primary component is a star that is leaving the main sequence with an absolute magnitude Mv=, dominates the observed spectrum and its spectral classification is A2pSrCrEu, meaning that it has stronger than usual absorption lines of strontium, chromium and europium. It is also a chemically peculiar star and classified as an Ap star.

The other two components contribute just 0.23 magnitudes to the apparent magnitude of HN Andromedae. One has an orbital period of 106.3 days, and some orbital parameters can be computed. The other has an orbital period longer than 5000 days.

Variability
The variability of HN Andromedae can be totally ascribed to the primary component, and is compatible with its stellar rotation; this gives the classification as an α2 Canum Venaticorum variable. Magnetic fields in this star are strong and variable, and this is thought to happen when the magnetic dipole axis in the star is not aligned to the rotation axis. Also, the distribution of metals, and consequently the surface brightness, is not uniform on the surface, and this causes the brightness observed variation.

References

Andromeda (constellation)
Andromedae, HN
J01241868+4308315
006560
008441
Alpha2 Canum Venaticorum variables
Ap stars
A-type main-sequence stars